The ABA League Ideal Starting Five, also known as the All-ABA League Team, is an honor which is given to the best five players of a given ABA League season. The ideal five of the season are selected by head coaches, fans and the ABA League Commission, with the coaches contributing 60%, the fans 30% and the Commission 10% of the votes for the final result.

Teams

See also
ABA League MVP
ABA League Finals MVP
ABA League Top Scorer
ABA League Top Prospect
Player of the Month

References

ABA League awards